Pebble Brook School is a co-educational special school in Aylesbury, Buckinghamshire. It is a community school, which takes children from the age of 11 through to the age of 16. The school has approximately 99 pupils.

The school caters for secondary school aged  children with moderate learning difficulties.

References

External links
Pebble Brook School Website
Ofsted Report 2009
Ofsted Report 2006
Ofsted Report 2004
Department for Education Performance Tables 2011

Special schools in Buckinghamshire
Aylesbury
Community schools in Buckinghamshire
Special secondary schools in England